The Netherlands has a public road network totaling 139,000 km, one of the densest in the world. Its use has increased since the 1950s and now exceeds 200 billion km traveled per year, three quarters of which is by car, making it among the most intensely used road networks. In 2019, the World Economic Forum ranked the quality of Dutch road infrastructure as the best in Europe and second to Singapore out of 141 countries. 

Dutch roads include at least 3,530 km of motorways and expressways, and with a motorway density of 64 kilometres per 1,000 km2, the country also has one of the densest motorway networks in the world. The Netherlands' main highway network (hoofdwegennet) consists of 5,200 km of national roads, together with the most prominent provincial roads. Although only about 2,500 km of roads are fully constructed to motorway standards, most of the remainder are also expressways for fast motor vehicles only.

Since 1997, a national traffic safety program called "Duurzaam Veilig (Verkeer)", or "Sustainable (Road) Safety" has had a major influence on the road network. A popular calming and collision reduction measure has been to replace intersections with roundabouts in order to reduce serious T-bone collisions. By 2015, there were almost 5,000 roundabouts throughout the Netherlands.

Except for motorways and expressways, most Dutch roads support cyclists; 35,000 km, a quarter of all roads, feature dedicated cycle tracks that are physically segregated from motor traffic. Another 4,700 km of roads have clearly marked bike lanes, and on other roads traffic calming has allowed cyclists and motorists to safely mix. Busy junctions sometimes give priority to cyclists, and in streets such as fietsstraten (cycle streets) and woonerven (home zones), bicycles always have priority over cars.

History
The first motorway in the Netherlands dates back to 1936, when the current A12 was opened to traffic between Voorburg and Zoetermeer, near The Hague. Motorway construction accelerated in the 1960s and 1970s but slowed in the 1980s. Current motorway expansion mostly occurs outside the Randstad.

General maximum speed limits were introduced in 1957 (50 km/h within built-up areas) and in 1973 (100 km/h on extra-urban highways); the motorway limit was raised to 120 km/h in 1988.

Roads by management authority

National and provincial roads

About 5,200 km of national roads (rijkswegen) are controlled by the Rijkswaterstaat, and the country's twelve provinces control about 7,800 km of provincial roads. Most motorways are national roads, and the remaining national roads are mostly expressways. Only a few motorways are provincial, and these are generally shorter and serve regional traffic.

Municipal roads

Municipal roads make up the bulk of the Dutch road network, totalling 120,000 km.

Water council roads

Aside from the division into provinces, the Netherlands is also divided into 21 water management districts. Together with other authorities, they own and control another 7,500 km of roads.

Roads by legal types and definitions

From 1998 to 2007, more than 33,000 km of roads have been converted to regional access roads with a speed limit of 60 km/h, as indicated by signage. Regional access roads are visually distinct from other roads by having no center line marking. Slower vehicles and non-motorised traffic are allowed; busier roads have adjacent cycle tracks, while quieter ones have advisory bike lanes. Regional access roads can fall under any of the road management authorities.

On extra-urban roundabouts, the CROW recommends that motor vehicles have priority over cycle tracks, as opposed to urban roundabouts where cycle tracks have priority.

Within built-up areas
From 1998 through 2007, more than 41,000 km of city streets have been converted to local access roads with a speed limit of 30 km/h, for the purpose of traffic calming.

Depending on how individual municipalities interpreted the 1997 Sustainable Safety policy guidelines, woonerven have come under pressure from a drive to implement continuous zones of 30 km/h (19 mph) on local access streets. In some towns, this has led to residents protesting against the doubling of local speed limits from 15 km/h to 30 km/h. Woonerven are still widespread and new ones are still built, sometimes because of space restrictions. In 2011, 20% of all Dutch homes were still located in woonerf areas, and around 2 million people (over 10% of the country) were living in woonerven.

Notable roads and statistics
As a side effect of the dense road network, roadside and verge grass strips account for three percent of the Netherlands' total land area.

Quality
In 2019, a World Economic Forum report ranked the quality (extensiveness and condition) of the Dutch road infrastructure as the best in Europe, with a 6.4 score on a 7point scale. It was ranked the second-best of 141 countries in the world behind Singapore and ahead of Switzerland.  Although traffic congestion is a relative constant in the Netherlands, a Europe-focused summary of TomTom's 2021 traffic congestion statistics found that there were no Dutch cities in the global Top100. There were also no Dutch cities in the high congestion category, although Haarlem was ranked #103 at 28% congestion in 2021, 2% below the "heavy" category.

Major motorways

The busiest Dutch motorway is the A13 between the Hague and Rotterdam, with a traffic volume of 140,000 motor vehicles per day. Utrecht, in the centre of the country, has the busiest motorways on average (almost 100,000 vehicles a day), with major motorways A1, A2, A12, A27 and A28 running through it.

The number of passing motorised vehicles is counted every minute of the day at 20,000 measuring stations on the Dutch motorway network.

See also
 Transport in the Netherlands
 Road transport in the Netherlands
 List of motorways in the Netherlands
 European E-roads in the Netherlands
 Rijksstraatweg
 National N-road route numbers (historic)
 Woonerf
 Fietsstraat
 Cycling in the Netherlands

Further reading

Sustainable (Road) Safety
Publications by SWOV – Dutch Institute for Road Safety Research
 Advancing Sustainable Safety - full English language explanation for 2005-2020 (217 p.)
 Advancing Sustainable Safety (in brief) - brief English explanation for 2005-2020 (20 p.)
 De balans opgemaakt - Dutch language evaluation for 1998–2007, with English abstract (67 p.)

Notes

External links
 autosnelwegen.nl – Dutch website about the country's national roads and its motorways.

References

 
Road infrastructure in the Netherlands
Road transport in the Netherlands
Transport infrastructure in the Netherlands
Traffic law
Law of the Netherlands
Traffic signs